Cambes-en-Plaine War Cemetery is a Second World War cemetery of Commonwealth soldiers in France, located seven km northwest of Caen, Normandy. The cemetery contains 224 graves of which one is unidentified.

History
Following the Allied landings on D-Day, elements of the East Riding Yeomanry, supporting the British 3rd Infantry Division pushed through to the northern outskirts of Cambes-en-Plaine on 9 June 1944. A defensive German line here stopped the advance on Caen. A large number of burials date to between the 8 and 12 July 1944, during Operation Charnwood, the final attack on Caen. Over half of the burials in the graveyard are from soldiers in the 59th (Staffordshire) Infantry Division.

Location
The cemetery is located in the commune of Cambes-en-Plaine, in the Calvados department of Normandy, on the Rue du Mesnil Ricard (D.79B).

Photographs

See also
 American Battle Monuments Commission
 UK National Inventory of War Memorials
 German War Graves Commission
 List of military cemeteries in Normandy

References

Further reading
 Shilleto, Carl, and Tolhurst, Mike (2008). A Traveler's Guide to D-Day and the Battle of Normandy. Northampton, Mass.: Interlink.

External links

 

World War II memorials in France
World War II cemeteries in France
British military memorials and cemeteries
Commonwealth War Graves Commission cemeteries in France
Canadian military memorials and cemeteries
1944 establishments in France
Cemeteries in Calvados (department)